Close to Seven is the fifth studio album by German singer Sandra, released on 17 February 1992 by Virgin Records.

Background
The album's title symbolised the upcoming seventh anniversary of Sandra's career. It was recorded in Sandra and Michael Cretu's home studio in Ibiza, Spain, and continued a development towards a more meditative, less dance-oriented musical style, echoing material that Sandra and Michael recorded together for the Enigma project. The male vocals were performed by Andy Jonas, also known as Andy "Angel" Hart.

"Don't Be Aggressive" was released as the first single from the album in January 1992, reaching the top 10 in Finland and Norway, and the top 20 in Sandra's native Germany. "I Need Love" followed as the second and final commercial single in April 1992, but was a commercial failure, becoming Sandra's first single since 1984 to fail to enter the charts. "Steady Me" was issued in June 1992 as a promotional single only in Germany.

Although Close to Seven did not sell as well as its predecessors, it was a commercial success and remains Sandra's second highest-charting album in Germany at number seven. It also reached the top 20 in Switzerland and Norway.

Track listing
"Don't Be Aggressive" (Michael Cretu, Klaus Hirschburger) – 4:45
"Mirrored in Your Eyes" (Michael Cretu, Peter Cornelius, Klaus Hirschburger) – 3:26
"I Need Love" (Michael Cretu, Klaus Hirschburger) – 3:24
"No Taboo" (Michael Cretu, David Fairstein) – 3:50
"When the Rain Doesn't Come" (Michael Cretu, Sandra Cretu) – 4:43
"Steady Me" (Michael Cretu, Peter Cornelius, Klaus Hirschburger) – 3:57
"Shadows" (Michael Cretu, Klaus Hirschburger) – 3:50
"Seal It Forever" (Michael Cretu, Klaus Hirschburger) – 4:51
"Love Turns to Pain" (Michael Cretu, Klaus Hirschburger) – 4:59
"Your Way to India" (Michael Cretu, Klaus Hirschburger) – 6:01

Personnel
Arranged, engineered and produced by Michael Cretu
Guitars by Tom Leonhard
Backing vocals by Andy "Angel" Hard
Photography by Jim Rakete
Cover art by HP Uertz and Lmp

Charts

References

1992 albums
Albums produced by Michael Cretu
Sandra (singer) albums
Virgin Records albums